The 1952 Colorado A&M Aggies football team represented Colorado State College of Agriculture and Mechanic Arts in the Skyline Conference during the 1952 college football season.  In their sixth season under head coach Bob Davis, the Aggies compiled a 6–4 record (4–2 against Skyline opponents), finished third in the Skyline Conference, and outscored all opponents by a total of 177 to 137.

Schedule

References

Colorado AandM
Colorado State Rams football seasons
Colorado AandM Aggies football